Sagir Adamu Abbas a professor, Nigerian academician, administrator, and 11th substantive Vice-Chancellor of Bayero University Kano.

Early life and education 
Sagir was born on 22 April 1962 at Yan Katifa, Kantudu  Madabo quarters of Kano Municipal Local Government Area, Kano State.

Career
Abbas started his career as a lecturer at Sa’adatu Rimi College of Education Kumbotso, in the Department of Mathematics. Sagir Joined Bayero University Kano as Assistant Lecturer in 1991. Sagir held some positions from Head of Department of Education, Sub-Dean, Deputy Dean, to acting Dean, Faculty of Education.

Sagir was appointed Director, Development Office where he served between 2004 and 2007, Sagir Abbas was appointed Senior Special Assistant to the former Minister of Education, Professor Ruqayyah Ahmed Rufa'i between April 2010 to September, 2013. Sagir was the Director, Directorate of Research, Innovation and Partnerships. The Governing Council of Bayero University Kano appointed Sagir on Thursday, 26 March 2015 as the Deputy Vice Chancellor Academics where he succeeded Professor Hafiz Abubakar, who was the running mate of Governor Abdullahi Umar Ganduje in the 2015 Nigerian general election.

Sagir Become the 11th Vice Chancellor of Bayero University Kano in 2020

References

1962 births
Living people
Alumni of the University of Bristol
Academic staff of Bayero University Kano
Vice-Chancellors of Nigerian universities